The LG Watch Sport is a smartwatch released by LG Corporation on Feb 09, 2017. The device is one of the first smartwatches to ship with Android Wear version 2.0 with LTE (telecommunication) and Android Pay support.

References

External links 
 Official Website

Android (operating system) devices
Products introduced in 2017
Wear OS devices
Smartwatches
LG Electronics products